The 2008 UK Music Video Awards were held on 14 October 2008 at the Odeon West End in Leicester Square, London to recognise the best in music videos and music film making from United Kingdom and worldwide. The nominations were announced on 25 September 2008.

Video of the Year

Video Genre Categories

General Video Categories

Craft and Technical Categories

Individual and Company Categories

References

External links
Official website

UK Music Video Awards
UK Music Video Awards
UK Music Video Awards